AirTrain Newark is a  monorail system connecting the terminals at Newark Liberty International Airport (EWR) and trains at Newark Liberty International Airport Station on the Northeast Corridor (NEC), where transfers are possible to Amtrak and NJ Transit's Northeast Corridor Line and North Jersey Coast Line.

History

Initial operations 

The monorail opened in 1996 and initially served only as an airport circulator, a service which allows passengers to transfer between airport terminals or concourses. The monorail track was refurbished and extended to the NEC, with construction beginning in 1997. The system reopened for service on October 21, 2000. When first opened in 1996 a fleet of 12 six-car trains ran on the network. It was later expanded to 18 six-car trains.

The contract to build the system was awarded to Von Roll, but the project was finished by Adtranz, who acquired Von Roll's monorail division while the system was being built. Adtranz was later acquired by Bombardier Transportation, which was itself purchased by Alstom, who continues to operate the AirTrain under contract to the Port Authority of New York and New Jersey, the operator of the airport.

AirTrain service was suspended from May 1, 2014, for 75 days, until mid-July, to allow repairs. Repairs were completed early, and the service re-opened on July 3.

Replacement 
The system has a projected lifespan of 25 years. In April 2015, the PANYNJ suggested that initial work to replace the system would cost $40 million in consultant and engineering studies. In 2017, the Port Authority decided to include the then $1.7 billion PATH extension to Newark Liberty Rail Link Station in their 2017 10-year capital plan, while the AirTrain was given $300 million for maintenance and repairs.

However, in January 2019, New Jersey Governor Phil Murphy announced a plan for a $2 billion replacement project for the AirTrain. Murphy has stated that replacement is necessary because the system is reaching the end of its projected 25-year life and is subject to persistent delays and breakdowns. The Port Authority would be responsible for funding the project. In October 2019, the Port Authority board approved the replacement project with an estimated cost of $2.05 billion. Construction was expected to start in 2021 and be completed in 2024.
A draft environmental impact statement was completed in February 2021 when the proposed opening date was shifted to 2026.

Fare 
The train is free, except to and from the Northeast Corridor station. In that case, an $8 "AirTrain access fee" is charged. When passengers purchase a ticket to or from the station the fee is added to the ticket price and a barcode is printed that can be used at a faregate array between the AirTrain platform and the train platform. Passengers using passes to another station and those who pay a cash fare on board the train must purchase a separate AirTrain ticket from machines located on either side of the faregates. Child tickets (ages 5 to 11) are exempt from this additional fare.

The access fee has been raised several times since the system was built, with the last increase to $8 announced on November 18, 2021, and coming into effect on March 1, 2022.

Stations 

The AirTrain has three major stations within the airport, one for each main terminal (A, B, and C).  These stations sit on top of the terminal buildings. There are two other stations (P3 and P4) for the parking lots and rental car facilities plus a sixth (RaiLink station) at the Northeast Corridor. The system originally included two more stations, P1 and P2, but P1 was removed in July 2019 to permit construction of a new consolidated rental car and parking facility, and P2 closed in June 2021 in connection with the same project. However, P2 station was reopened in conjunction with the new terminal A in January 2023, and has since been renamed to Terminal A. The former Terminal A station is now used as an "employees only" stop. Automated announcements recorded by former traffic reporter Bernie Wagenblast tell riders which airlines can be found in each terminal, as well as connections at other stations. In 2007, the average daily paid ridership was 4,930.

The stations are:
 Newark Liberty International Airport Station (RaiLink station, Amtrak/NJ Transit trains)
 P4 (Parking P4/shuttles to hotels and off-airport parking/passenger pick-up and drop-off)
 Terminal C 
 Terminal B 
 Employees only (former Terminal A)
 P3 (Rental car center)
 Terminal A (former P2 station reopened January 2023)
 P1 (demolished July 2019)

See also 
List of rapid transit systems
List of airport circulators
Airport rail link
AirTrain JFK
AirTrain LaGuardia

References

External links 

 
 PDF Brochure 
 PDF Travel Guide for Hotel and Travel Professionals 

Monorails
Von Roll Holding people movers
Railway lines opened in 1996
Airport rail links in the United States
Monorails in the United States
Airport people mover systems in the United States
Rapid transit in New Jersey
Transportation in Elizabeth, New Jersey
Transportation in Newark, New Jersey
 
1996 establishments in New Jersey
Newark Liberty International Airport